"Is You Is or Is You Ain't My Baby"  is a song written by Louis Jordan and Billy Austin. The song's first recording, by Jordan, was made on October 4, 1943. It was released as the B-side of a single with "G.I. Jive" with the title "Is You Is or Is You Ain't (Ma' Baby)".  The song  reached No. 1 on the US folk/country charts, number two for three weeks on the pop chart, and number three on the R&B chart.

One publication of the Smithsonian Institution provided this summary of Jordan's music.One important stylistic prototype in the development of R&B was jump blues, pioneered by Louis Jordan, with ... His Tympany Five ... three horns and a rhythm section, while stylistically his music melded elements of swing and blues, incorporating the shuffle rhythm, boogie-woogie bass lines, and short horn patterns or riffs. The songs featured the use of African American vernacular language, humor, and vocal call-and-response sections between Jordan and the band. Jordan’s music appealed to both African American and white audiences, and he had broad success with hit songs like "Is You Is or Is You Ain’t My Baby" (1944).

In the 1932 American film Harlem Is Heaven, dancer Bill "Bojangles" Robinson, accompanied by jazz pianist Putney Dandridge, sings "Is You Is or Is You Ain't."  The song in the film has different lyrics, but, in addition to its title, its melody is at times similar to that later used for "Is You Is or Is You Ain't My Baby."

Bing Crosby and The Andrews Sisters recorded the song on June 30, 1944 for Decca Records and it too reached the No. 2 spot in the Billboard charts during a 12-week stay.

The song was covered by Ira "Buck" Woods as Tom Cat in the 1946 Tom & Jerry short Solid Serenade, which is what the song is mainly known for.

The standard has been recorded by more than 130 different artists over the years. 

B. B. King and Dr. John covered it on Let the Good Times Roll, King's Louis Jordan tribute album; the song won the 2001 Grammy Award for Best Pop Collaboration with Vocals.

References

1944 songs
Louis Jordan songs
Songs written by Louis Jordan
Cab Calloway songs